Heisteria pallida is a plant species in the genus Heisteria found in Brazil.

The stem bark of H. pallida contains ourateacatechin (4′-O-methyl-(−)-epigallocatechin), ouratea-proanthocyanidin A (epiafzelechin-(4β→8)-4′-O-methyl-(−)-epigallocatechin) and the trimeric propelargonidin epiafzelechin-(4β→8)-epiafzelechin-(4β→8)-4′-O-methyl-(−)-epigallocatechin.

References

External links 
 tropicos.org

Olacaceae
Plants described in 1872